The 1891 FA Cup final was contested by Blackburn Rovers and Notts County at the Kennington Oval. Blackburn won 3–1, their second consecutive FA Cup Final victory, with goals by Geordie Dewar, Jack Southworth and William Townley. James Oswald scored Notts County's goal.

Match details

References
Line-ups
Match report at www.fa-cupfinals.co.uk

 

1891
Final
Blackburn Rovers F.C. matches
Notts County F.C. matches
March 1891 sports events
1891 sports events in London